Qualification for the 2015 Little League World Series took place in eight United States regions and eight international regions from June through August 2015. Starting this year, all eight United States regional tournaments used a modified double elimination format and moved away from the round robin format used since the 1990s.

United States

Great Lakes
The tournament took place in Indianapolis, Indiana from August 9–15.

Mid-Atlantic
The tournament took place in Bristol, Connecticut from August 10–16.

Midwest
The tournament took place in Indianapolis, Indiana from August 9–15.

Note: North Dakota and South Dakota are organized into a single Little League district.

New England
The tournament took place in Bristol, Connecticut from August 10–16.

Northwest
The tournament took place in San Bernardino, California from August 9–15.

Southeast
The tournament took place in Warner Robins, Georgia from August 7–13.

Southwest
The tournament took place in Waco, Texas from August 7–13.

West
The tournament took place in San Bernardino, California from August 9–15.

International

Asia-Pacific and Middle East
The tournament took place in Guilin, China from July 13–21.

Australia
The tournament took place in Lismore, New South Wales on June 4–9. The top two teams in each pool advance to the elimination round, where they are seeded one through eight based on overall record. The "runs against ratio" (RAR) is used as the tiebreaker. It is calculated by the number of runs scored against a team, divided by the number of defensive innings the team played.

Canada
The tournament took place in Ottawa, Ontario from August 7–16.

Caribbean
The tournament took place in Willemstad, Curaçao from July 18–25.

Europe and Africa
The tournament took place in Kutno, Poland from July 16–23. The format of the tournament is double elimination.

Japan
The first two rounds of the tournament took place on July 19. The semifinals and championship were played on July 20. All games were played in Shirakawa, Fukushima.

Latin America
The tournament took place in Panama City, Panama from July 11–18.

Mexico
The tournament took place in Matamoros, Tamaulipas from July 11–17.

References

2015 Little League World Series
2015 in baseball